Robbie Jones may refer to:

Robbie Jones (American football) (born 1959), former NFL linebacker
Robbie Jones (actor) (born 1977), American actor

See also
Robert Jones (disambiguation)